Caenis horaria is a species of mayfly in the genus Caenis.

References
 

Mayflies
Insects described in 1758
Taxa named by Carl Linnaeus